Batman, in films, may refer to:
 Batman (1966 film): directed by Leslie H. Martinson; starring Adam West, Burt Ward, Cesar Romero, Burgess Meredith
 Batman (1989 film): directed by Tim Burton; starring Michael Keaton, Jack Nicholson, Kim Basinger, Jack Palance
 Batman Returns (1992): directed by Tim Burton; starring Michael Keaton, Danny DeVito, Michelle Pfeiffer, Christopher Walken
 Batman Forever (1995): directed by Joel Schumacher; starring Val Kilmer, Tommy Lee Jones, Jim Carrey, Nicole Kidman, Chris O'Donnell
 Batman & Robin (1997): directed by Joel Schumacher; starring George Clooney, Arnold Schwarzenegger, Chris O'Donnell, Uma Thurman, Alicia Silverstone
 Batman Begins (2005): directed by Christopher Nolan; starring Christian Bale, Michael Caine, Liam Neeson, Katie Holmes, Gary Oldman, Rutger Hauer, Morgan Freeman
 The Dark Knight (2008): directed by Christopher Nolan; starring Christian Bale, Michael Caine, Heath Ledger, Gary Oldman, Aaron Eckhart, Maggie Gyllenhaal, Morgan Freeman
 The Dark Knight Rises (2012): directed by Christopher Nolan; starring Christian Bale, Michael Caine, Gary Oldman, Anne Hathaway, Tom Hardy, Marion Cotillard
 Batman v Superman: Dawn of Justice (2016): directed by Zack Snyder; starring Ben Affleck, Henry Cavill
 The Lego Batman Movie (2017): directed by Chris McKay; starring the voices of Will Arnett, Zach Galifianakis, Michael Cera, Rosario Dawson, Ralph Fiennes
 The Batman (2022): directed by Matt Reeves; starring Robert Pattinson, Zoë Kravitz, Paul Dano

See also
 Batman in film
 Batman (disambiguation)